The mountain frog is an Australian species of frog in the family Myobatrachidae.

Mountain frog may also refer to:

 Chamula mountain brook frog, a hylid frog endemic to Mexico
 Mountain chorus frog, a hylid frog of the United States
 Mountain mist frog, a hylid frog of Australia
 Mountain rain frog, a brevicipitid frog endemic to South Africa
 Mountain yellow-legged frog, a ranid frog endemic to California, United States
 Masked mountain frog, a myobatrachid frog of Australia

See also

 Mountain tree frog (disambiguation)

Animal common name disambiguation pages